Howard A. Tullman is an American serial entrepreneur, venture capitalist, educator, writer, lecturer, and art collector. He is the former executive director of the Ed Kaplan Family Institute for Innovation and Tech Entrepreneurship at Illinois Tech in Chicago and the first University Professor appointed at IIT. He is the former CEO of 1871, the current General Managing Partner of G2T3V, LLC, and the current General Managing Partner of Chicago High Tech Investment Partners LLC, both early stage venture capital funds based in Chicago.

Early life 
Born in St. Louis, Missouri in 1945, Tullman was raised in a family of eight. He is the son of an apparel salesman and a stay-at-home mother (who later ran for public office in New Jersey) and the eldest of six siblings.

By age 10, Tullman built a candy racket and a magic performance business in his free time. Tullman and his family moved to Highland Park, Illinois in 1955. Tullman graduated from Highland Park High School in 1963.

Education 
Tullman attended Northwestern University for his undergraduate degree, graduating cum laude in 1967 with a B.A. in Mathematics and Economics. He went on to receive his J.D. from Northwestern's School of Law where he graduated with Honors in 1970. During his time at Northwestern, Tullman was elected to the Order of the Coif and served as the Chairman of the Editors of the Law Review. He was selected as a Ford Foundation Fellow and developed, along with James R. Thompson, former Governor of Illinois, a national Ford Foundation program for the study of criminal law. Tullman practiced law from the time he was admitted to the Bar in 1970 until 1980, specializing in large-scale class action cases and Chapter 11 bankruptcy cases. In 1974, he was admitted on special petition to the Bar of the United States Supreme Court. He retired from law to found CCC Information Services.

Entrepreneurial career 
As of May 2011, Tullman has started 12 companies, including Tribeca Flashpoint Media Arts Academy, CCC Information Services, Tunes.com, the Rolling Stone Network, Imagination Pilots, Experiencia, and others. Tullman has held senior executive positions at Coin Inc., Worldwide Xceed and Kendall College, where he helped save the school from going into bankruptcy in 2003.

Positions held 

 Executive Director, Ed Kaplan Family Institute for Innovation and Entrepreneurship, Illinois Tech
 CEO, 1871, the Number 1 ranked University-Affiliated Tech Incubator in the World 
 President and CEO, Tribeca Flashpoint Media Arts Academy
 Chairman and CEO, Experiencia
 President, Kendall College
 CEO, Worldwide Xceed Group, Inc., a public Chicago-based provider of digital strategy and Internet design services
 CEO, Tunes.com, an early provider of online digital music and other resources and the developer under his guidance and direction of Rollingstone.com, DownbeatJazz.com and The Source.com
 CEO, Imagination Pilots, Inc., a multimedia software developer specializing in CD-ROM games and entertainment products for the PC and Macintosh
 CEO, Eager Enterprises, Inc., a privately held information industry venture capital firm which he founded in Chicago
 Chairman, Financial Protection Services, a privately held corporation providing computerized information to businesses and consumers
 Founder and CEO, CCC Information Services Inc. a  Software as a Service provider to the automotive, insurance, and collision repair industries, owed by PE firm, Advent International
 CEO, Information Kinetics, Inc. and Career Network, which developed and marketed a national computerized database of job candidates
 CEO, COIN, Inc., a provider of automotive information, communication channels, and information management systems to the automotive industry and to related credit and financial industries
 Co-founder, Monumental Art and Events, Inc., an event marketing organization
 CEO, Original Research II, a customer satisfaction measurement and management company
 Chairman of the Board and Lead Director of The Cobalt Group in Seattle and The Princeton Review in New York

1871 Chicago 

In January 2014, Tullman became CEO of 1871, a non-profit startup hub located in The Merchandise Mart in Chicago and of its parent, the Chicagoland Entrepreneurial Center (CEC). 1871 was founded in May 2012 and is home to over 495 digital startups.

Tullman helped establish The Bunker, a veteran-run startup incubator.

Written works 

Tullman has written, lectured and been interviewed on a number of legal and career issues. He has contributed chapters to several books, including Life After Law and Innovating Chicago Style. He wrote the preface for You Need to be a Little Crazy by Barry Moltz, and his business ventures are included in Robert Jordan's book How They Did It.

Tullman has written a column "The Perspiration Principles", which has appeared weekly for 8 years on Inc. Magazine's website, Inc.com. The 450 plus articles published on Inc. served as the foundation for Tullman's book series, The Perspiration Principles. He is the author of HindSight, a newsletter on current topics of interest to entrepreneurs and managers.

Howard A. and Judith Tullman art collection 
The Howard A. and Judith Tullman art collection is among the largest and most diverse collections of contemporary realist art in America. The collection contains upwards of 1,300 pieces, more than 250 of which previously lined the halls of Tribeca Flashpoint Media Arts Academy and are now displayed in Tullman private gallery and studio in Chicago.

In addition to being an active collector, Tullman has lent and donated art from the Tullman Collection to museums including:
 
 Mary and Leigh Block Museum of Art
 Smart Museum of Art of the University of Chicago
 Art Institute of Chicago
 Chicago Children's Museum
 Evanston Art Center
 The Springfield Art Museum
 Milwaukee Art Museum
 Madison Museum of Contemporary Art
 The Arnot Museum
 Frye Museum
 Mobile Museum of Art
 The Museum of the South
 Museum of Contemporary Art, Chicago

Tullman has worked closely with various artists and created a limited edition work of art in collaboration with the internationally known artist, Christo, which was used as a fundraising project for the Museum of Contemporary Art, where he previously served as a Trustee. The Tullman Collection has been featured in numerous catalogs including a major publication Creative Imaginings of 61 paintings from the Collection by the Mobile Museum of Art. See https://www.amazon.com/Creative-Imaginings-Howard-Tullman-Collection/dp/1893174093/ref=sr_1_33?qid=1645138585&refinements=p_27%3AHoward+A+Tullman&s=books&sr=1-33.

Works
 Altman, Mary Ann (1991). Life After Law: Second Careers for Lawyers. W. Smith Co. .
 Kuczmarski, Thomas D.; Dan Miller and Luke Tanen (2012). Innovating Chicago Style: How Local Innovators are Building the National Economy. Chicago: Book Ends Publisher. pp. 74–75. .
 Moltz, Barry (2008). You Need To Be a Little Crazy. Chicago: AuthorHouse. pp. xiii. .
 Jordan, Robert (2010). How They Did It: Billion Dollar Insights from the Heart of America. Chicago: RedFlash Press. pp. 152–156. .
 Tullman, Howard A. (2012). The Perspiration Principles Volume I. CreateSpace Independent Publishing Platform. .
 Tullman, Howard A. (2012). The Perspiration Principles Volume II. CreateSpace Independent Publishing Platform. .
 Tullman, Howard A. (2012). The Perspiration Principles Volume III. CreateSpace Independent Publishing Platform. .
 Tullman, Howard A. (2013). The Perspiration Principles Volume IV. CreateSpace Independent Publishing Platform. .
 Tullman, Howard A. (2013). The Perspiration Principles Volume V. CreateSpace Independent Publishing Platform. .
 Tullman, Howard A. (2014). The Perspiration Principles Volume VI. CreateSpace Independent Publishing Platform. .
 Tullman, Howard A. (2014). The Perspiration Principles Volume VII. CreateSpace Independent Publishing Platform. .
 Tullman, Howard A. (2014). The Perspiration Principles Volume VIII. CreateSpace Independent Publishing Platform. .
 Tullman, Howard A. (2014). The Perspiration Principles Volume IX. CreateSpace Independent Publishing Platform. .
 Tullman, Howard A. (2014). The Perspiration Principles Volume X. CreateSpace Independent Publishing Platform. .
 Tullman, Howard A. (2014). The Perspiration Principles Volume XI. CreateSpace Independent Publishing Platform. 
 Tullman, Howard A. (2014). The Perspiration Principles Volume XII. BlogIntoBook.com. .
 Tullman, Howard A. (2015). The Perspiration Principles Volume XIII. BlogIntoBook.com. .
 Tullman, Howard A. (2015). The Perspiration Principles Volume XIV. BlogIntoBook.com. .
 Tullman, Howard A. (2015). The Perspiration Principles Volume XV. BlogIntoBook.com. .
 Tullman, Howard A. (2015). The Perspiration Principles Volume XVI. BlogIntoBook.com. .
 Tullman, Howard A. (2016). The Perspiration Principles Volume XVII. BlogIntoBook.com. .
 Tullman, Howard A. (2016). The Perspiration Principles Volume XVIII. BlogIntoBook.com. .
 Tullman, Howard A. (2016). The Perspiration Principles Volume XIX. BlogIntoBook.com.  .
 Tullman, Howard A. (2016). The Perspiration Principles Volume XX. BlogIntoBook.com. .
 Tullman, Howard A. (2017). The Perspiration Principles Volume XXI. BlogIntoBook.com. .
 Tullman, Howard A. (2017). The Perspiration Principles Volume XXII. BlogIntoBook.com. .
 Tullman, Howard A. (2017). The Perspiration Principles Volume XXIII. BlogIntoBook.com. .
 Tullman, Howard A. (2018). The Perspiration Principles Volume XXIV. BlogIntoBook.com. .
 Tullman, Howard A. (2014). Tullman on Company Culture: How to Build & Grow a Successful Business. BlogIntoBook.com. .
 Tullman, Howard A. (2015). Fundraising in the Digital Age: You Get What You Work For, Not What You Wish For. BlogIntoBook.com. .
 Tullman, Howard A. (2015). Launching a Startup in the Digital Age: You Get What You Work For, Not What You Wish For. BlogIntoBook.com. .
 Tullman, Howard A. (2016). Sales & Marketing in the Digital Age: You Get What You Work For, Not What You Wish For. BlogIntoBook.com. .
 Tullman, Howard A. (2016). Customer Acquisition & Retention in the Digital Age: You Get What You Work For, Not What You Wish For. BlogIntoBook.com. .
 Tullman, Howard A. (2016). Growing a Startup in the Digital Age: You Get What You Work For, Not What You Wish for. BlogIntoBook.com. .
 Tullman, Howard A. (2017). Managing a Startup in the Digital Age: You Get What You Work For, Not What You Wish For. BlogIntoBook.com. .
 Tullman, Howard A. (2017). The Perspiration Principles - Education Edition: You Get What You Work For, Not What You Wish For. BlogIntoBook.com. .
 Tullman, Howard A. (2019). You Can't Win A Race With Your Mouth. BlogIntoBook.com. .

References

External links 
  , The Magic Man - How Howard Tullman has Produced the Ultimate Innovator's Playpen,
  , For-profit schools a lesson in business, Ann Meyer, Chicago Tribune, January 14, 2008.
  , Howard Tullman's Flashpoint Academy: A Digital-Arts Alternative to the Four-Year College Degree, Chicago Magazine, May 13, 2011.
  ,"ALL IN","[Illinois Tech Magazine]",Chicago, Fall, 2018.
  "How Glen and Howard Tullman Became Entrepreneurs", Businessweek, Chicago, August 21, 2008. Retrieved on November 20, 2012.
  "The Most Accomplished, Best-Connected Entrepreneur You've Never Heard Of", Inc. Magazine, February 28, 2012. Retrieved on November 27, 2012.
  "The Practical University", New York Times, New York, April 4, 2013. Retrieved on April 23, 2013.
  "Need a Job? Invent It.", New York Times, New York, March 30, 2013. Retrieved on April 23, 2013.
  "The Professors’ Big Stage", New York Times, New York, March 5, 2013. Retrieved on April 23, 2013.
  "Revolution Hits the Universities", New York Times, New York, January 26, 2013. Retrieved on April 23, 2013.
 , "Blackline Review", Retrieved on March 4, 2015.

1945 births
Living people
American educators
American businesspeople
Ford Foundation fellowships